Samuel "Eddie" Hodges (born March 5, 1947) is an American former child actor and recording artist (his 1961 cover of the Isley Brothers’ “I'm Gonna Knock on Your Door” reached #12 on the Billboard Hot 100), who left show business as an adult.

Early life
Hodges was born in Hattiesburg, Mississippi, United States, and traveled to New York City with his family in 1952. This began a long career in show business for Hodges in films, on stage and popular recordings.

Career

Stage
At the age of ten, Hodges made his professional acting debut on stage in Meredith Willson's 1957 Broadway musical The Music Man, in which he originated the character of Winthrop Paroo, and introduced the song "Gary, Indiana", with Robert Preston and Pert Kelton.

Film
He made his film debut in the 1959 film A Hole in the Head with Frank Sinatra and Edward G. Robinson, in which Hodges and Sinatra performed the song "High Hopes". However, when Sinatra recorded the song for Capitol Records, Hodges was not invited to participate as his record label, Decca, would not grant him permission to record on Capitol. 

Hodges made eight feature films and numerous TV guest appearances. He is probably best remembered for playing the title role in Michael Curtiz's 1960 film The Adventures of Huckleberry Finn. He also appeared in the 1962 film Advise and Consent in a minor role as well as the Disney films Summer Magic (1963) and The Happiest Millionaire (1967).

TV
Hodges made guest appearances on shows such as Bonanza, Gunsmoke (1967, “Mail Drop” S12E19), Cimarron Strip and The Dick Van Dyke Show. On August 2, 1959, Hodges was the "mystery guest" on the popular panel show What's My Line?

On October 4, 1957, the day the Soviet Union launched the Sputnik 1 satellite, Hodges made a memorable appearance on the game show Name That Tune in which he partnered with then Major (and future astronaut and United States senator) John Glenn.

In the early 1990s, the adult Hodges appeared live on a talk show on Swedish TV, where he played guitar and sang "I'm Gonna Knock on Your Door".

Recording
Hodges issued his first single in 1958, a duet with Julia Meade called "What Would It Be Like In Heaven?"  In 1959 at age 12, Hodges became Mississippi's first Grammy Award winner for his contribution to the original Broadway cast album of The Music Man, on which he sang a solo ("The Wells Fargo Wagon") and was credited as lead singer on the song "Gary, Indiana". It was the first year the Grammys were awarded.

In 1961 at age 14, Hodges recorded his biggest hit for Cadence Records, "I'm Gonna Knock on Your Door". He also scored a minor hit with "(Girls, Girls, Girls) Made to Love," a song written by Phil Everly and originally recorded by the Everly Brothers. He subsequently recorded for several other record labels, issuing a total of 15 singles as a performer between 1958 and 1967.

Before leaving Hollywood he was a union musician, record producer, songwriter and music publisher. He collaborated with Tandyn Almer as both co-writer and co-producer for a non-charting single by rock group The Paper Fortress in 1968; as well, he owned his own music publishing business. Hodges continues to write songs today but is no longer involved professionally in the music industry.

Personal life

Hodges was drafted into the Army during the Vietnam War in the late 1960s but remained in the U.S. in a non-combat assignment. After he was discharged, he returned to Hollywood and became disillusioned with show business. He decided to return to his native Mississippi and entered the University of Southern Mississippi, where he received his B.S. in Psychology and an M.S. in Counseling. He became a mental health counselor and eventually retired from practice after a long career in the field. He converted to Catholicism in 1998.

He is divorced and has two grown children as well as six grandchildren. He occasionally gets in touch with his old show business friends and still writes songs, though he is unable to play guitar due to spinal nerve injuries. Hodges rode out Hurricane Katrina in 2005 and informed his fans that he was fine after being without water, electricity and telephone/internet contact for 19 days until the utilities were finally restored.

Filmography

Discography

Charting Singles

References

Bibliography
 Holmstrom, John. The Moving Picture Boy: An International Encyclopaedia from 1895 to 1995. Norwich, Michael Russell, 1996, p. 264.

External links

American male child actors
1947 births
Living people
Converts to Roman Catholicism
People from Hattiesburg, Mississippi
Military personnel from Mississippi
United States Army soldiers
University of Southern Mississippi alumni
Cadence Records artists
Male actors from Mississippi
Catholics from Mississippi